Carol Melton Sanders (July 30, 1932 – August 28, 2012) was an American bridge player from Nashville, Tennessee. She was married to Thomas K. Sanders, also a bridge player. She won four world championships, all in partnership with Betty Ann Kennedy of Louisiana.

Sanders and Kennedy were known as the Belles or Southern Belles. They compiled 10 NABC wins and 8 runners-up together.

Both Carol and Tom Sanders were inducted into the ACBL Hall of Fame in 2002.

Sanders was the only child of Beulah and Clarence Melton. She died in Nashville in 2012, less than a year after the death of her husband.

Bridge accomplishments

Honors

 ACBL Hall of Fame, 2002

Wins

 North American Bridge Championships (16)
 Whitehead Women's Pairs (1) 1993 
 Hilliard Mixed Pairs (1) 1961 
 Women's Pairs (1958-62) (1) 1962 
 Smith Life Master Women's Pairs (1) 1990 
 Machlin Women's Swiss Teams (2) 1983, 1995 
 Wagar Women's Knockout Teams (6) 1963, 1978, 1980, 1983, 1987, 1999 
 Sternberg Women's Board-a-Match Teams (2) 1992, 1995 
 Chicago Mixed Board-a-Match (2) 1976, 1982

Runners-up

 North American Bridge Championships
 Rockwell Mixed Pairs (1) 1979 
 Silodor Open Pairs (1) 1960 
 Whitehead Women's Pairs (1) 1990 
 Smith Life Master Women's Pairs (2) 1971, 1981 
 Machlin Women's Swiss Teams (1) 1985 
 Wagar Women's Knockout Teams (3) 1982, 1992, 1994 
 Sternberg Women's Board-a-Match Teams (3) 1986, 1991, 2000 
 Chicago Mixed Board-a-Match (1) 1984 
 Reisinger (1) 1961

References

External links
  – with video interview
 
 Funeral home obituary

1932 births
2012 deaths
American contract bridge players
People from Nashville, Tennessee